Mathikoloni is a village in the Limassol District of Cyprus, located 10 km north of Limassol.

Location 
 Mathikoloni is located at an altitude of 335 meters above sea level. It borders on the southwest with Agios Athanasios, on the west with Fasoula, on the north and northwest with Apsiou, on the northeast with Dierona, on the east with Akrounta and on the south with Germasogeia.

History 
The original location of the village was further west, but due to an earthquake the Cypriot government created a new settlement at its current location. The old settlement is abandoned. It became famous when he was used to shoot the BBC television series The Aphrodite Inheritance in 1979. Old Mathikoloni was included in the list of villages that belonged to the Great Commandaria. It first belonged to the Knights Templar and then to the Knights of St. John.

Population 

According to the population censuses carried out in Cyprus, the population of the village experienced several fluctuations. The last two censuses show an increase. The table below presents the population of Mathikoloni as recorded in the population censuses conducted in Cyprus.

References

Communities in Limassol District